The 1952 LPGA Tour was the third season since the LPGA Tour officially began in 1950. The season ran from January 4 to October 28. The season consisted of 24 official money events. Betsy Rawls won the most tournaments, eight. Rawls led the money list with earnings of $14,505.

There was only one first-time winner in 1952, Marlene Bauer.

The tournament results are listed below.

Tournament results
The following table shows all the official money events for the 1952 season. "Date" is the ending date of the tournament. The numbers in parentheses after the winners' names are the number of wins they had on the tour up to and including that event. Majors are shown in bold.

References

External links
LPGA Tour official site

LPGA Tour seasons
LPGA Tour